Sushil Barongpa is an Indian politician . He was a Member of Parliament, representing Himachal Pradesh in the Rajya Sabha the upper house of India's Parliament as a member of the Indian National Congress.

References

Rajya Sabha members from Himachal Pradesh
Indian National Congress politicians from Himachal Pradesh
1947 births
Living people